Odell Pollard (April 29, 1927 - May 12, 2015) was a lawyer and politician in Arkansas. He switched from being a Democrat to becoming a member of the Republican Party. In the 1960s, he chaired the Arkansas Republican Party. In 1967 he addressed the Urban League of Little Rock. He had a law firm in Searcy, Arkansas, for many years and worked to transform Arkansas from Democratic Party domination into  two-party state. He was a liberal Republican and a close ally of Winthrop Rockefeller.

He was born in Union Hill, Arkansas. He graduated from University of Arkansas School of Law in 1950.

Further reading
“State GOP Elects Pollard Chairman, Hears Caution Plea.” by Mike Barrier Arkansas Gazette, December 11, 1966, pages 1A and 2A.
“New GOP Chairman Was Once a Democrat, Never Voted That Way.” Arkansas Gazette December 18, 1966, page 24A.
Agenda for Reform: Winthrop Rockefeller as Governor of Arkansas, 1967–1971 by Cathy Kunzinger Urwin, Fayetteville: University of Arkansas Press, 1991

References

1927 births
2015 deaths
Arkansas lawyers
Arkansas politicians
University of Arkansas School of Law alumni
Arkansas Democrats
Arkansas Republicans